= Kent Gardens =

Kent Gardens may refer to:

- Kent Gardens Elementary School, McLean, Virginia, USA
- Kent Gardens Park, McLean, Virginia, USA

== See also ==
- Kent, a town in England, referred to as the Garden town
